Spirorbis spirorbis is a small (3–4 mm) coiled polychaete that lives attached to seaweeds and eel grass in shallow saltwater.

They have a smooth, white, sinistral (left-handed) coiled shell encasing an orange body about 3 mm in length. The tube has a peripheral flange where it attaches to the substrate.

The worm has a short abdominal region and a slightly broader thorax terminating in ten stiff tentacles, used to filter food from the water. One of the tentacles is slightly larger than the rest and shaped like a saucer, which is used as an operculum. This seals the opening of the shell and serves to protect the worm from predators and desiccation when out of water.

It lives primarily on toothed wrack (Fucus serratus) and bladder wrack (Fucus vesiculosus), but is also found on the basal part of thongweed (Himanthalia elongata). Numerous individuals can be found on any one surface.

Spirorbis spirorbis are cross fertilising hermaphrodites, who brood their young in a tube attached to the worm inside the shell. The larvae are released at an advanced stage of development and spend just a few hours as free-living organisms before attaching themselves to the nearest suitable surface, often the same seaweed as the parent.

Distribution
All around Britain and Ireland; North Norway to the English Channel.  Cape Cod.

External links
  General spirorbid morphology and ecology

Serpulidae
Animals described in 1758
Taxa named by Carl Linnaeus